Todd Martin was the defending champion but lost in the third round to Guy Forget.

Pete Sampras won in the final 7–6(7–3), 7–6(8–6) against Forget.

Seeds
The top eight seeds received a bye to the second round.

  Pete Sampras (champion)
  Boris Becker (semifinals)
  Goran Ivanišević (quarterfinals)
  Wayne Ferriera (third round)
  Todd Martin (third round)
  Marc Rosset (third round)
  Stefan Edberg (third round)
  Jonas Björkman (third round)
  David Wheaton (first round)
  Jason Stoltenberg (third round)
  Guy Forget (final)
  Mark Woodforde (first round)
  Alexander Volkov (second round)
  Patrick Rafter (second round)
  Javier Frana (third round)
  Martin Sinner (first round)

Draw

Finals

Top half

Section 1

Section 2

Bottom half

Section 3

Section 4

External links 
 1995 Stella Artois Championships draw

Singles